Chicken Shack are a British blues band, founded in the mid-1960s by Stan Webb (guitar and vocals), Andy Silvester (bass guitar), and Alan Morley (drums), who were later joined by Christine Perfect (later McVie) (vocals and keyboards) in 1967. Chicken Shack has performed with various line-ups, Stan Webb being the only constant member.

Career
David "Rowdy" Yeats and Andy Silvester had formed Sounds of Blue in 1964 as a Stourbridge-based rhythm and blues band.  They invited Stan Webb, who was leaving local band The Shades 5, to join them. The band also included Christine Perfect and Chris Wood (later to join Traffic) amongst others in their line up. With a new line-up Chicken Shack was formed as a trio in 1965, naming themselves after Jimmy Smith's Back at the Chicken Shack album.  Chicken shacks (open-air roadside chicken stands) had also been frequently mentioned in blues and R&B songs, as in Amos Milburn's hit, "Chicken Shack Boogie". Over the next few years the band had a residency at the Star-Club, Hamburg with Morley, then Al Sykes, Hughie Flint (who was John Mayall's drummer when Eric Clapton was in the band) and later Dave Bidwell on drums.

40 Blue Fingers, Freshly Packed and Ready to Serve
Chicken Shack made their first UK appearance at the 1967 National Jazz and Blues Festival, Windsor and signed to Mike Vernon's Blue Horizon record label in the same year. Their first single “It's Okay With Me Baby / When My Left Eye Jumps” (BH 57-3135), was released in 1968, shortly before their first LP release 40 Blue Fingers, Freshly Packed and Ready to Serve was released later that year. Christine Perfect composed and sang on side A of the first single and Stan Webb composed and sang the flip side. Both sides of the first single were not included in the first LP release. The first single and the debut LP attracted a lot of attention and 40 Blue Fingers… ended up having considerable chart success (No. 12 on the British Album Charts). While waiting to finish their second LP, the band released a second single, "Worried About My Woman / Six Nights In Seven" (BH 57-3143) in late 1968 with little fanfare. Both songs were composed and sung by Stan Webb.

O.K. Ken?
Their second LP, O.K. Ken? was released in February 1969 and also garnered chart success. While it did surpass the first album by reaching No. 9, unlike the initial LP, it quickly dropped out of the charts due to the lack of an album single to support it. The band then decided to release a song from the first album (40 Blue Fingers...),  "When The Train Comes Back” (BH 57-3146) after overdubbing a horn section to the original track. The flipside “Hey Baby” was an outtake of the O.K. Ken? album. Christine Perfect composed and provided piano and lead vocals on both tracks but the single was only mildly successful.

"I'd Rather Go Blind" single
Chicken Shack had become a mainstay of the white blues boom in the late 1960s, and they enjoyed some commercial success with their two first albums reaching the TOP 20 in UK album chart. Worried that the band's popularity would fade without a successful radio single, they decided to record a song that had been successful for Etta James in the US. The single "I'd Rather Go Blind" (c/w "Night Life") ended up becoming very successful with Christine Perfect singing lead vocals. The single was successful enough that it garnered Perfect the Top Female Singer on the Melody Maker’s Reader’s Poll in 1969.

Christine Perfect's departure

The single "I'd Rather Go Blind" had been recorded after the release of the first two LPs and Perfect had already decided to leave the band and retire from the music business before the single had become successful. By this time, she had already quietly married bass player from John McVie from the blues band Fleetwood Mac and did not wish to be touring in a separate band. Because of the success of the single, the band’s record label, Blue Horizon, convinced her to release a solo album before considering retirement. The exact single recording by Chicken Shack of “I’d Rather Go Blind” was included on Perfect’s eponymous album “Christine Perfect” released on the same label, Blue Horizon. After Perfect’s departure from the band in 1969, she was quickly replaced by Paul Raymond from Plastic Penny. Chicken Shack continued recording and performing live, releasing a few more albums and having some success with the single  "Tears in the Wind" (c/w "The Things You Put Me Through").

After being dropped by Blue Horizon, pianist Paul Raymond, bassist Andy Silvester, and drummer Dave Bidwell all left in 1971 to join Savoy Brown. At this point Webb reformed the band as a trio with John Glascock on bass and Paul Hancox on drums, and they recorded Imagination Lady. The line-up did not last; Glascock left to join Carmen, while Webb was recruited for Savoy Brown in 1974 and recorded the album Boogie Brothers with them.

Since 1977, Webb has revived the Chicken Shack name on a number of occasions, with a rotating membership of British blues musicians including, at various times, Paul Butler (ex-Jellybread, Keef Hartley Band)(guitar), Keef Hartley, ex-Ten Years After drummer Ric Lee and Miller Anderson, some of whom came and went several times. The band has remained popular as a live attraction in Europe throughout.

Webb remains as their only constant band member.

Personnel

Members
Current
Stan Webb  – guitar, vocals (1965–1974, 1976–present)
Gary Davies – guitar (1988–present)
Jim Rudge – bass (1998–present)

Former

Andy Silvester – bass (1965–1971)
Alan Morley – drums (1965–1968)
Christine Perfect – keyboards, vocals (1968–1969; died 2022)
Chris Wood – saxophone, flute 
Al Sykes – drums (1968)
Hughie Flint – drums (1968)
Dave Bidwell – drums, percussion (1968–1971; died 1977)
Paul Raymond  – keyboards, vocals (1969–1971; died 2019)
John Glascock – bass (1971–1972; died 1979)
Pip Pyle  – drums (1971; died 2006)
Paul Hancox – drums, percussion (1971–1972)
Bob Daisley – bass (1972, 1979–1980)
David Wilkinson – keyboards (1972–1974, 1986–1993)
Rob Hull – bass (1972–1974)
Alan Powell – drums (1972–1974)
Dave Winthrop – saxophone (1976–1979, 1986–1987, 2008–2012)
Robbie Blunt – guitar (1976–1979)
Ed Spivock – drums (1976–1979)
Paul Martinez – bass (1976–1978)
Steve York – bass (1978–1979)
Paul Butler – guitar (1979–1981)
Keef Hartley – drums (1979–1980; died 2011)
Ric Lee – drums (1980–1981)
Alan Scott – bass (1980)
Andy Pyle – bass (1980–1986)
Tony Ashton – keyboards (1981; died 2001)
Miller Anderson – guitar (1981–1986)
Russ Alder – drums (1981–1983)
John Gunsell – drums (1983–1987)
Roger Saunders – guitar (1983–1986)
Andy Scott – bass (1983–1986)
Jan Connolly – bass (1986–1987)
Bev Smith – drums (1987–2002; died 2007 )
Wayne Terry – bass (1987)
David Wintour – bass (1987–1991; died 2022)
James Morgan – bass (1991–1998)
Mick Jones – drums (2002–2010)
Chris Williams – drums (2010–2012)
Romek Parol – drums (2012–2013)

Line-ups

Timeline

Discography

Albums
 40 Blue Fingers, Freshly Packed and Ready to Serve (1968), Blue Horizon  – UK Albums Chart No. 12
 O.K. Ken? (1969), Blue Horizon – UK Albums Chart No. 9
 100 Ton Chicken (1969), Blue Horizon
 Accept (1970), Blue Horizon
 Imagination Lady (1972), Deram
 Unlucky Boy (1973), Deram
 Goodbye Chicken Shack  (Live) (1974), Nova; London
 That's the Way We Are (1978), Shark [as Stan Webb's Chicken Shack]
 The Creeper (1978), WEA [as Stan Webb's Chicken Shack]
 Chicken Shack (1979), Gull
 Roadies Concerto (Live) (1981), RCA Records [as Stan Webb's Chicken Shack]
 39 Bars (1981), Bellaphon [as Stan Webb's Chicken Shack]
 Simply Live (Live) (1989), SPV (Germany) [as Stan Webb's Chicken Shack]
 On Air (BBC sessions) (1998), Strange Fruit Records
 Black Night (1999), [as Stan Webb's Chicken Shack])
 Webb (2001)
 Still Live After All These Years (2004), Mystic
 Stan Webb (2004)

Compilations
 Double ("Unlucky Boy" + "Goodbye Chicken Shack") (1977), Deram
 Stan the Man (Live) (1977), Nova
 In the Can (1980), Epic Records
 Reflections (1993), Secret Records [as Stan Webb with Chicken Shack]
 Stan The Man (2002), Decca
 Going Up, Going Down - The Anthology (2004), Castle Music
 The Complete Blue Horizon Sessions (2006)
 Poor Boy: The Deram Years (2006), Castle Music [as Stan Webb's Chicken Shack]
 Strange Situations: The Indigo Sessions (2006), [as Stan Webb's Chicken Shack]
 Reflections ("Plucking Good" + "Changes (Expanded Edition)") (2008), Secret Records [as Stan Webb with Chicken Shack]
 Chicken Shack - The Blue Horizon Session (2007), Blue Horizon Records

Singles

References

Further reading
 The New Musical Express Book of Rock, 1975, Star Books,

External links
 
 Fansite
 Unofficial Stan Webb website

British blues musical groups
Musical groups from Birmingham, West Midlands
Musical groups established in 1965
British rhythm and blues boom musicians
Deram Records artists
1965 establishments in the United Kingdom